Pluto is a dwarf planet in the Solar System.

Pluto or Plouto may also refer to:

Mythology
Pluto (mythology), god who rules over the underworld
Plouto (mother of Tantalus)
Plouto (Oceanid), a daughter of Oceanus and Tethys

Places
Pluto, Mississippi, United States
Pluto, West Virginia, United States

People with the name
Derek Murray (sports presenter) or "Pluto", Scottish sports journalist and commentator
Terry Pluto (born 1955), American sportswriter
Pluto Shervington (born 1950), Jamaican reggae entertainer

Arts, entertainment, and media

Fictional characters
Pluto (Astro Boy), a character in Astro Boy
Pluto (Disney), a Disney dog character created in 1930
Pluto (Marvel Comics), a character in Marvel Comics
Pluto (The Hills Have Eyes), a character in The Hills Have Eyes
Mr. Pluto and Mayhew Pluto, a father and son in Virginia Hamilton's Dies Drear Chronicles
Pluto, a cat in "The Black Cat" by Edgar Allan Poe
Sailor Pluto, a character in the Sailor Moon franchise

Music

Groups and labels
Pluto (Canadian band)
Pluto (New Zealand band)
Pluto (Portuguese band)
Pluto Records, a record label

Albums
Pluto (EP), an EP by Seigmen
Pluto (Future album) (2012)
Pluto x Baby Pluto, studio album by Lil Uzi Vert and Future (2020)

Songs and compositions
"Pluto" (orchestral movement), an expansion by Colin Matthews for Gustav Holst's The Planets
"Pluto" (song), by Björk, 1997
"Pluto", by 2 Skinnee J's from SuperMercado!
"Pluto", by Naughty Boy from Hotel Cabana

Other uses in arts, entertainment, and media
Pluto (film), a South Korean film
Pluto (manga), by Naoki Urasawa
Pluto (newspaper), the student newspaper at the University of Central Lancashire
Pluto Press, a British publishing house
Pluto TV, a free online television service

Military
HMS Pluto, a list of ships of the Royal Navy
HMS Tamar (1758) or HMS Pluto, a 16-gun Favourite-class sloop-of-war of the Royal Navy
Operation Pluto, World War II undersea oil pipelines between England and France
Project Pluto, a U.S. nuclear powered cruise missile

Science and technology
Pluto (wasp), a genus of wasps in the family Crabronidae
Argyrodes pluto, a species of cobweb spider in the family Theridiidae
Callilepis pluto, a species of ground spider in the family Gnaphosidae
The Pluto euptera, a species of butterfly in the family Nymphalidae
Fodinoidea pluto, a species of moth in the family Erebidae
Megachile pluto, also known as Wallace's giant bee or raja ofu/rotu ofu, a species of bee in the family Megachilidae
PLUTO detector, a particle detector that was operated at DESY in the 1970s
PLUTO reactor, a nuclear reactor at Harwell, Oxfordshire
Pluto.jl, a notebook (programming environment) for Julia (programming language)

Transportation
Pluto, a South Devon Railway Gorgon class 4-4-0ST steam locomotive
Bortolanza Pluto, an Italian ultralight aircraft

Other uses
Pluto (astrology), the ruling planet of the astrological sign Scorpio
Pluto Water, a laxative product popular in the United States in the early 20th century

See also
Bluto
Pluton (disambiguation)
Plutonium, the element named after the dwarf planet Pluto
Plutus